Lotnisko is a neighbourhood of the city of Szczecin, Poland, located within the municipal neighbourhood (city district) of Dąbie. It is situated on right bank of Oder river. It is unhabituated, and is centred around the Szczecin-Dąbie Airstrip.

Notes

References 

Lotnisko